Laurent Anselmi (born 1962) is a Monégasque politician in Monte Carlo.

Politics in Monaco 
, he serves as Minister of Foreign Affairs and Cooperation. He becomes Chief of Staff for Prince Albert II of Monaco as of January 2022.

Other roles 
Besides these official ranks, Anselmi is also:
 President of the Monégasque Language Commission 
 General secretary of the Chancellery of the Order of Saint-Charles
 Member of the Ethics Committee of the Prince Albert II Foundation

Distinctions  
 Commandeur de l’Ordre Saint Charles (Monaco) 
 Grande ufficiale del'Ordine della Stella d'Italia

References 

Living people
Place of birth missing (living people)
Foreign ministers of Monaco
Monegasque politicians
1962 births